Kara Goucher (born Kara Grgas on July 9, 1978) is an American long-distance runner. She was the 10,000 meters silver medalist at the 2007 World Championships in Athletics and represented the USA at the 2008 Beijing Olympics and 2012 London Olympics. She made her marathon debut in 2008 and finished third the following year at the Boston Marathon.

She competed collegiately for the University of Colorado and was a three-time NCAA champion (twice in track and once in cross country).

Personal life
Goucher was born Kara Grgas in Queens, New York. When she was four years old her family moved to Duluth, Minnesota, after her father was killed by a drunk driver on the Harlem River Drive. When her mother remarried, Kara took her stepfather's name and was known as Kara Grgas-Wheeler. She ran in high school for Duluth East.

She married fellow runner and US Olympian Adam Goucher from Colorado in 2001, competing as Kara Goucher from that point forward. Kara gave birth to their son, Colton (Colt) Mirko Goucher, on September 25, 2010. In 2014, she moved with her family from Portland, Oregon to Boulder, Colorado. Both Kara and Adam hold individual NCAA cross country titles, from 2000 and 1998 respectively.

In 2021, Goucher was diagnosed with repetitive exercise dystonia after noticing lack of sensation in her legs and difficulty running.

Running career

College
As a runner for the University of Colorado, Goucher broke out in 2000, becoming the NCAA Outdoor Champion in 3000 m and 5000 m, the NCAA Cross Country Champion, and also a 5000 m Olympic Trials Finalist (eighth). She won the Honda Sports Award as the best female collegiate cross country runner in the nation in 2001. She graduated from the University of Colorado in 2001.

Professional
After college Goucher battled injuries for several years, but then came back strong in 2006. After finishing second in the 5K at the USATF Outdoor Championships in 2006, she set PRs at all distances on the international circuit, running the World "A" Standard in the 1500 m, 5000 m, and 10000 m. She finished third in 3000 metres at the 2006 IAAF World Cup in a new personal best time of 8:41.42.  Her 3k time led the nation and her 10k time ranked her as the 2nd fastest American woman of all-time. At the 2007 IAAF World Championships in Osaka, Japan she won the silver medal in the women's 10,000 m event.

In September 2007, she won the Great North Run in 1:06:57, the fastest woman's half-marathon time of the year, setting a new American best time at the distance and beating marathon world record-holder Paula Radcliffe, on the latter's comeback from pregnancy and injury. The half-marathon was Goucher's first competitive race longer than 10k.

Goucher kicked off 2008 with a win in the prestigious Millrose Games mile with a personal record of 4:36:03. At the 2008 Prefontaine Classic track meet in Eugene, Oregon, USA, Goucher ran the 5000 m, the same race as the World Record attempt by Meseret Defar. Goucher ran well to place third behind Defar and Kenyan Vivian Cheruiyot in her second fastest ever time of 14:58.10 minutes.

Goucher raced in the USATF Championships and Olympic Trials on June 27, 2008, in the 5000 m and the 10,000 m.  The championships were held at Hayward Field, Eugene, Oregon. Goucher already had the Olympic A Standard, but achieved it again, recording 31:37.72 at 10,000 m, finishing second behind American record-holder Shalane Flanagan's 31:34.81.  In the 5000 m, Goucher won her semi final heat with a time of 15:32.32, and won the final race with a time of 15:01.02. Goucher competed in the Beijing 2008 Summer Olympics 10,000 m final where she placed tenth with a personal best time of 30:55.16, and the 5000 m where she placed ninth with a time of 15:49.39.

Goucher made her marathon debut at the New York City Marathon on November 2, 2008. She finished in third place in a time of 2:25:53, becoming the first American on the podium since Anne Marie Lauck was third in 1994. Goucher was chosen as the 2008 Road Runner of the Year in the Open Female division by the Road Runners Club of America.

The next year, she won the 2009 Lisbon Half Marathon, and placed third in the 2009 Boston Marathon in a time of 2:32:25. She finished tenth in the marathon at the 2009 World Championships in Athletics, with a time of 2:27:48.

Goucher became pregnant in early 2010 and took a season away from competition as a result. Following the birth of her child, she returned to competition at the Arizona Half Marathon in January 2011, and finished as the runner-up behind Madaí Pérez. At the 2011 New York City Half Marathon, she placed third with a time of 1:09:03 hours.

In April 2011, Goucher returned to marathoning at the 2011 Boston Marathon, where she placed fifth with a time of 2:24:52 hours, setting a new personal best by a minute. She was runner-up to Shalane Flanagan over 10,000 m at the 2011 USA Outdoor Track and Field Championships and later ran in the event at the 2011 World Championships in Athletics, where she finished 13th overall. In December, she competed at the inaugural  Miami Beach Half Marathon and was again second behind Flanagan. Goucher left Nike‘s Oregon Project in October 2011 after seven years.

Goucher qualified for the 2012 Summer Olympics by placing third at the U.S. Olympic marathon trials on January 14, 2012 in Houston, finishing with a time of 2:26:06. She came third at the New York Half Marathon that March, running a time of 1:09:12 hours. Goucher placed 11th in the 2012 Summer Olympics with a time of 2:26.07.

She returned to the 2013 Boston Marathon on April 15, placing 6th with a time of 2:28:11.  The event would later be disrupted by a pair of consecutive explosions near the finish line, killing three spectators and injuring over 180 others.  At the time of the explosions, she was resting in her hotel room with her family, the blasts close enough to shake the windows to their room.

Goucher competed in the Philadelphia Half Marathon on September 21, 2014.  She was sixth with a time of 1:11:39. Kara placed 14th (4th among American women) in the TCS New York City Marathon on November 2, 2014 in 2:37:03.

Goucher finished 18th in the 2015 USATF Championships with a time of 16:05.35. On 13 February 2016, Goucher placed fourth at the US Olympic Marathon Trials, finishing in 2:30:24.

Achievements

Personal records

References

External links
 
Kara Goucher's Book: Strong
 Kara Goucher's official website
 USATF Athlete Bio of Kara Goucher

1978 births
Living people
American female long-distance runners
American female marathon runners
Colorado Buffaloes women's cross country runners
Colorado Buffaloes women's track and field athletes
Athletes (track and field) at the 2008 Summer Olympics
Athletes (track and field) at the 2012 Summer Olympics
Olympic track and field athletes of the United States
American people of Croatian descent
Track and field athletes from Minnesota
Track and field athletes from New York City
Sportspeople from Duluth, Minnesota
Track and field athletes from Portland, Oregon
Sportspeople from Queens, New York
World Athletics Championships medalists